This is a list of Lamar Cardinals football players in the NFL Draft.

Key

Selections

References

Lamar

Lamar Cardinals NFL Draft